Frank Pearce (31 March 1869 – 2 January 1933) was a Jamaican cricketer. He played in twelve first-class matches for the Jamaican cricket team from 1894 to 1909.

See also
 List of Jamaican representative cricketers

References

External links
 

1869 births
1933 deaths
Jamaican cricketers
Jamaica cricketers
Cricketers from Kingston, Jamaica